The 2020–21 East Tennessee State Buccaneers men's basketball team represented East Tennessee State University in the 2020–21 NCAA Division I men's basketball season. The Buccaneers, led by first-year head coach Jason Shay, played their home games at the Freedom Hall Civic Center in Johnson City, Tennessee, as members of the Southern Conference.

Previous season
The Buccaneers finished the 2019–20 season 30–4, 16–2 in SoCon play to finish as the SoCon regular season champions. They defeated VMI, Western Carolina and Wofford to become champions of the SoCon tournament. They earned the SoCon's automatic bid to the NCAA tournament. However, the NCAA Tournament was cancelled amid the COVID-19 pandemic.

On April 30, 2020, head coach Steve Forbes resigned to become the head coach at Wake Forest. He finished at ETSU with a five-year record of 130–43.

Roster

Schedule and results

|-
!colspan=12 style=| Non-conference Regular season

|-
!colspan=12 style=| SoCon Regular season

|-
!colspan=12 style=| SoCon tournament
|-

Source

References

East Tennessee State Buccaneers men's basketball seasons
East Tennessee State
East Tennessee State Buccaneers men's basketball
East Tennessee State Buccaneers men's basketball